Events in the year 2017 in Liechtenstein.

Incumbents 
 Prince: Hans-Adam II
 Regent: Alois
 Prime Minister: Adrian Hasler

Events 

 5 February – Liechtenstein general election, 2017.

Sport 
 The 2016–17 Liechtenstein Cup is the 72nd season of Liechtenstein's annual cup competition. The first round, second round, and quarterfinals took place in 2016. The semifinals are held on 5 and 11 April 2017, and the final on 24 May. The cup winner qualifies to the first qualifying round of the 2017–18 UEFA Europa League. In the final, on 24 May 2017, FC Vaduz won 5:1 over USV Eschen/Mauren.

Deaths

See also 

 2017 in Europe
 City states

References 

 
2010s in Liechtenstein
Years of the 21st century in Liechtenstein
Liechtenstein
Liechtenstein